Rhinos, Winos and Lunatics (stylized on the cover as man: rhinos, winos + lunatics) is the eighth album by the Welsh rock band Man and was released May 1974 on the United Artists Records label. It was produced by Roy Thomas Baker, noted for his work with Queen, and spent 4 weeks in the UK album chart, peaking at No 24. The album marked the return of Deke Leonard and the introduction of two members from Help Yourself.

Track listing 
All tracks composed by Jones, Leonard, Morley, Whaley and Williams except where noted.

Personnel 

 Micky Jones – guitar, vocals
 Deke Leonard – guitar, vocals
 Malcolm Morley – guitar, keyboards, vocals
 Ken Whaley – bass
 Terry Williams – drums, vocals

Credits 
 Producer – Roy Thomas Baker
 Engineers – Peter Kelsey, Martin Levan
 Liner Notes – Michael Heatley
 Art Direction, Design – Pierre Tubbs
 Front and back cover photography – Keith Morris
 Inside photography – David Redfern International

References

External links 
 Man - Rhinos, Winos and Lunatics (1974) album review by Paul Collins, credits & releases at AllMusic.com
 Man - Rhinos, Winos and Lunatics (1974) album releases & credits at Discogs.com
 Man - Rhinos, Winos and Lunatics (1974) album to be listened as stream at Spotify.com

1974 albums
Man (band) albums
Albums produced by Roy Thomas Baker
United Artists Records albums
Albums recorded at Trident Studios
Albums recorded at Morgan Sound Studios